The Columbia and Greenville Railroad was a South Carolina railroad that operated in the late 19th century.

Originally chartered and begun as the Greenville and Columbia Railroad, the line was sold under foreclosure and reorganized under the Columbia and Greenville name in 1880.

Beginning in 1886, it was leased to the Richmond and Danville Railroad and in 1894 it was incorporated into the Southern Railway.

References

Defunct South Carolina railroads
Railway companies established in 1880
Railway companies disestablished in 1894
1880 establishments in South Carolina
5 ft gauge railways in the United States
1894 disestablishments in South Carolina